Gunde Jaari Gallanthayyinde is a 2013 Indian Telugu-language romantic comedy film directed by debutant Vijay Kumar Konda and written by Harsha Vardhan. Produced by N. Nikitha Reddy under the banner of Shresht Movies, The film stars Nithiin, Nithya Menen, and Isha Talwar. Anup Rubens composed the music while I. Andrew and Prawin Pudi handled the cinematography and editing respectively.

The film's title is inspired from the song "Dil Se" from Gabbar Singh (2012). The film was a success at the box office, emerging as a consecutive successful film for Nithiin after Ishq (2012), which also starred Nithya Menen. The film was dubbed and released in Hindi and Malayalam as Heart Attack 2 in 2018 and Magic Love respectively. In 2015, It was remade in Kannada as Khushi Khushiyagi and in Meitei as Nungshi Feijei.

Plot
Karthik is an independent software engineer, who believes that one should make decisions independently. At his friend Pandu's wedding reception, Karthik sees Sruthi and develops feelings for her. He asks Pandu's wife to provide intel about Sruthi. After Pandu's wife gives Sruthi's number to Pandu and asks him to convey it to Karthik. A  miscommunication occurs between Karthik and Pandu leads to Karthik calling Sravani. Karthik mistakes Sravani for Sruthi where he converse with her in the cell phone and calls her Bangaram. Unknown to him, Sravani knows about Karthik and the two become phone friends/best friends.

Meanwhile, Karthik helps his friend Madhu in gaining a girl's attention, who is actually Sruthi. Sruthi falls for Madhu and Karthik learns of the confusion.
After learning the confusion, Sravani plans to avenge the deception by Karthik (who harassed Sravani, thinking that he was talking to Sruthi) and gains employment as Karthik's boss and decides to put him through the same hardships and even attempts to seduce him. A chain-of-events leads to Madhu doubting Sruthi, and their relationship is at stake, but they unite with Karthik's help.

Karthik decide to propose to Sravani and Sravani is ready to reject his proposal to complete her vengeance. Karthik reveals to Sravani that he is not a perfect match for her and had realized that he is truly in love with Bangaram (Sravani). After leaving the office, Karthik reaches Sravani's house where he apologize and proposes to her. Sravani reveals her true identity and the couple reunite with a hug.

Cast

Soundtrack

The soundtrack was composed by Anup Rubens and was released in Hyderabad on 27 March 2013. The soundtrack was distributed by Shreyas Music. Krishna Chaitanya penned four songs for the film. Producer Dil Raju was the chief guest and launched the audio CD. A. Karunakaran, B. V. Nandini Reddy, Surender Reddy, Kona Venkat, Bandla Ganesh, and Jwala Gutta were other guests at the audio launch. "Yemaindho Yemo ee Vela", a hit song from Pawan Kalyan's Tholi Prema, was remixed in the movie.

Reception
The movie completed 100 days in 18 centres all over Andhra Pradesh and Telangana states.

Box office
It was released in over 450 theatres worldwide, collecting  25.09 crores and becoming the biggest hit in Nithiin's career.

Awards
Filmfare Awards South
 Best Actress – Telugu - Nithya Menen
 Nominated – Best Film – Telugu - Nikitha Reddy, Vikram Goud
 Nominated – Best Actor – Telugu - Nithiin
 Nominated - Best Supporting Actress – Telugu - Isha Talwar

References

External links
 

2013 films
Telugu films remade in other languages
2010s Telugu-language films
Indian drama films
Films shot in Hyderabad, India
2013 drama films
Films shot in Oman
Films shot in Abu Dhabi
Films shot in the United Arab Emirates